The 2013 Super GT International Series Malaysia was the third round of the 2013 Super GT season. It took place on June 16, 2013.

Race result
Race result is as follows.

References

External links
Super GT official website 

Super GT International Series Malaysia
Super GT International Series Malaysia